"Mis-Shapes" is a song written and released by Sheffield band Pulp from their 1995 album Different Class. Lyrically inspired by Cocker's experiences socializing in Sheffield as an outcast, the song features lyrics that call for misfits to unite and take over. This lyrical theme would make Cocker uncomfortable with Pulp's growing popularity with "townies" after the song's release.

"Mis-Shapes" was released as a double-A sided single with "Sorted for E's & Wizz", the second single from Different Class after "Common People." Like its predecessor, the single reached number two in the UK charts and has since seen critical acclaim.

Background
"Mis-Shapes" was written as an ode to the outcasts that Pulp as a band identified with. Drummer Nick Banks summed up the song's message, stating, "What an opener, a call to arms, a rallying cry, now is the time to storm the barricades. If you've ever been bullied, called a weirdo, hit, spat at for being, looking, or feeling different... this is your tune!" At a 1995 concert, frontman Jarvis Cocker introduced the song as a call to take on the "blokes with 'taches in short-sleeved white shirts telling you that you're the weirdo."

Lyrically, the song was inspired by Cocker's experience going to clubs in his home town of Sheffield during the 1980s. He recalled:

Cocker reflected on the song's contradiction with the laddish audience the Britpop scene attracted, "All you can do is be as precise and be as good at what you do as possible and throw it out there. You can't control who goes into the shop and buys your records, you can't say, 'Oh, we're going to move into a more mature market.' People have to decide that. I mean, you write a song like 'Mis-Shapes' and it should be perfectly clear that it's saying, 'I don't like intolerant people.' But it's become clear to me after that last tour that it goes over some people's heads. Townies were coming out to see us."

The song's guitar solo was initially composed by Cocker, but its final version was modified by recently-joined guitarist Mark Webber, who called the song one of his favorites in 1996. The song's title, according to Cocker, originates from his "mum buying mis-shaped chocolates." Cocker recalled, Mis-Shapes' are these chocolates and they used to have them in the sweet-shop next to our house. They were the ones that had gone wrong in the factory - they were misshapen - kind of 'elephant man' of the sweet world! You could buy them in a bag much cheaper than a normal box of chocolates would be and they tasted as good, it's just that aesthetically they weren't that pleasing so that seemed to be a fairly reasonable metaphor."

Lyrics and music
Deborah Orr of The Guardian described "Mis-Shapes" as "the song that contains Cocker's statement of intent," while The Telegraph called the track "[Cocker's] anthem to nerd youth, a battle-cry to misfits everywhere." Cocker said of the song's lyrical content:

David Stubbs of Melody Maker described the song as "musically is so cleverly redolent of the glitzy plasticity of glam but also lino on bedsit floors." Stephen Thomas Erlewine of AllMusic called the song a "faux-show tune romp."

Release
"Mis-Shapes" was released as a double A-sided single with "Sorted for E's & Wizz" on 25 September 1995. The double-A sided single reached number two on the UK Singles Chart, though the single did attract controversy due to the drug themes of "Sorted for E's and Wizz". It was Pulp's second successive number-two hit in 1995, with "Common People" having reached the same position in June. As a standalone single, "Mis-Shapes" reached number 15 in Finland and number 25 in Sweden.

Despite being one of Pulp's biggest hits it did not appear on their best of album Hits. Cocker reflected on the song in 1999, "I can't really listen to that song anymore to be honest but I know at the time I was quite excited. It was like all the kind of speccy losers were coming out the libraries and taking over. That was my idea. It was a nice idea but unfortunately it didn't quite happen did it?"

Music video
The band also produced a music video for the song where Cocker appeared as both the singer of the band and as a "blokey" character that spat beer in the face of his "misfit" performer role. Cocker explained, "In the 'Mis-Shapes' video I acted, which is something I was very dubious about because pop stars acting is normally very tragic. Let's mention Sting there. So, being dubious, I got very drunk to do it. And then I started getting into it, I could see the attraction was not giving a shit about anything."

The background extras were found at a club; Cocker stated, "The kids they got for the video were from this really savage nightclub, and they were totally intimidating everybody on the set - they weren't acting. But I liked it, because after all this time of running away from these people I could be one for two days."

Reception
"Mis-Shapes" has seen positive reception from critics. Awarding it five out of five and "best new single" in Smash Hits, Mark Sutherland called the song "a brilliant rallying call to anyone else who's ever felt they didn't quite fit in. Like 'Common People,' it's an epic single, all spiralling keyboards and brilliant lyrics."  Time Out praised the song as "a splenetic, stuttering, demolition of all the people who made Jarvis's life a misery before fate knocked on the wrong door and made him a sex symbol." Melody Makers David Stubbs described "Mis-Shapes" as "a song that so brazenly pushes all of the right buttons, it's hard to see how they were ever anything less than an instant pop success." Rolling Stones David Fricke called the song "a blast of plastic, fantastic vengeance against the plebes, sort of the Pet Shop Boys meet the Clash's 'White Riot.

NME readers ranked the song as Pulp's seventh best in a fan vote. The Guardian named it as one of Pulp's ten best songs, writing, "It's an intellectual putsch, a nerdy spring, and it's still as convincing today as it was back then."

Track listing
All songs written and composed by Jarvis Cocker, Nick Banks, Steve Mackey, Russell Senior, Candida Doyle and Mark Webber; except where noted.7-inch vinyl and cassette single "Mis-Shapes" – 3:45
 "Sorted for E's & Wizz" – 3:42CD single one (Catalogue no. CID 620) and 12-inch vinyl
 "Mis-Shapes" – 3:45
 "Sorted for E's & Wizz" – 3:42
 "P.T.A. (Parent Teacher Association)" – 3:15
 "Common People" (Live at Glastonbury)  – 7:38CD single two' (Catalogue no. CIDX 620)
 "Sorted for E's & Wizz" – 3:42
 "Mis-Shapes" – 3:45
 "Common People" (Motiv 8 Club Mix)  – 7:50
 "Common People" (Vocoda Mix)  – 6:18

Personnel
Jarvis Cocker: Vocals, Acoustic Guitar
Russell Senior: Electric Guitar
Mark Webber: Electric Guitar
Candida Doyle: Piano, Synthesizers
Anne Dudley: Strings
Steve Mackey: Bass Guitar
Nick Banks: Drums

Charts and certifications

Weekly charts

"Mis-Shapes"

"Mis-Shapes" / "Sorted for E's & Wizz"

Year-end charts

Certifications

References

External links
 Mis-Shapes & Sorted For E's & Wizz at Discogs

1995 singles
1995 songs
Island Records singles
Pulp (band) songs
Song recordings produced by Chris Thomas (record producer)
Songs written by Candida Doyle
Songs written by Jarvis Cocker
Songs written by Mark Webber (guitarist)
Songs written by Nick Banks
Songs written by Russell Senior
Songs written by Steve Mackey